Ranked lists of the Counties of Sweden.

By population

By area

By density

 
Sweden geography-related lists